The Incredible Hulk is a fictional character of Marvel Comics.

The Incredible Hulk may also refer to:

Comics
 The Incredible Hulk (comic book), the main Hulk comic series (1963-)
 The Incredible Hulk (comic strip), a comic strip based in the TV series (1978-1982)
 Hulk Comic or The Incredible Hulk Weekly

Film
 The Incredible Hulk (film), a 2008 film starring Edward Norton
 The Incredible Hulk (soundtrack)

Television
 The Incredible Hulk (1978 TV series), a live-action TV series (1977-1982)
 The Incredible Hulk: Original Soundtrack Recording (1999)
 The Incredible Hulk (1982 TV series), an animated TV series (1982-1983)
 The Incredible Hulk (1996 TV series), an animated TV series (1996-1997)
 "The Incredible Hulk", a segment from The Marvel Super Heroes (1966)

Video games 
 The Incredible Hulk (1994 video game)
 The Incredible Hulk (2003 video game)
 The Incredible Hulk (2008 video game)

Other uses
 The Incredible Hulk (roller coaster), a roller coaster at Islands of Adventure in Orlando, Florida
 Incredible Hulk (cocktail), a green cocktail
 The Incredible Hulk (California), a summit in the Sierra Nevada, US

See also
 Hulk (disambiguation)
 Hulk in other media